XHCER-FM (100.7 FM) is a radio station in Cerralvo, Nuevo León, known as Vive FM. XHCER is part of the Nuevo León state-owned Radio Nuevo León public network.

References

Radio stations in Nuevo León